Lower Juba (Maay: Jubithy Hoosy) is an administrative region (gobol) in southern Somalia. With its capital at Kismayo, it lies in the autonomous Jubaland region. It has green forests and wildlife including lions, giraffes, hippos, crocodiles, and hyenas.

Lower Juba is bordered by Kenya, the Somali regions of Gedo, Middle Juba (Jubbada Dhexe), and the Somali Sea. The province is named after the Jubba River that passes through it and empties into the Somali Sea at Goobweyn. The Lag Badana National Park is situated in Lower Juba.

History
In the latter half of the 20th century, a few Darod families started to settle in Kismayo city. By the turn of the 20th century they had established a small business centres. In the beginning of the Somali civil wars, Kismaio known as Waamo faced a massive destruction among the faction leaders mainly between Hawiye and Darod each claiming the ownership of the Lower & Middle Juba regions. However, the city subsequently evolved into a major hub of the livestock trade. The main Harti representatives to establish themselves in Kismayo were Majeerteen traders from the northeastern Ras Hafun promontory, who were referred to as Hafuuni. In the first two decades of the 20th century, members of the Dhulbahante Harti sub-clan followed suit.

Between 1974 and 1975, a major drought referred to as the Abaartii Dabadheer ("The Lingering Drought") occurred in the northern regions of Somalia. The Soviet Union, which at the time maintained strategic relations with the Siad Barre government, airlifted some 90,000 people from the devastated regions of Hobyo and Caynaba. New small settlements referred to as Danwadaagaha ("Collective Settlements") were then created in Jubbada Hoose (Lower Jubba) and Jubbada Dhexe (Middle Jubba) regions. The transplanted families were also introduced to farming and fishing techniques, a change from their traditional pastoralist lifestyle of livestock herding.

Districts
Lower Juba Region consists of 6 districts:

 Afmadow District
 Badhaadhe District
 Jamaame District
 Hoosingow District
 Kismaayo District
 Xagar District
 Kudhaa District
 Dhoobley District 

The Bajuni Islands are also within the region.

Towns
Afmadow
Dhoobleey
Jamaame
Hoosingow
Kismayo
Badhaadhe
Buula Xaaji
Dalsan
Ras Kamboni
Kudhaa
Calanleey

Fuuma

Notes

External links
 Administrative map of Lower Juba

 

Regions of Somalia